"Glorious Sea, Sacred Baikal" is a folk song of Siberia, Russia, which has been sung since the 19th century. Its words are by Dmitriy Davidov (Дмитрий Павлович Давыдов), but its composer is unknown.

Words
During the first half of the 19th century, many Russians were exiled to Siberia as the results of the Decembrist revolt (1825) etc. In 1848, Dmitriy Davidov, after visiting Ulan-Ude, wrote a poem entitled "Thoughts of a Fugitive in Baikal" in eleven stanzas, of which five were put into this song.

The song's first stanza:

See also
 "The Wanderer"

References

Lake Baikal
Russian folk songs
History of Siberia
19th-century songs
Year of song unknown
Songwriter unknown